Brusand Station is a railway station located at Brusand in the municipality of Hå in Rogaland county, Norway. It is located on the Sørland Line. The station is served by Jæren Commuter Rail between Stavanger and Egersund. Prior to 1922, the name was simply Bru.

References

External links
 Jernbaneverket Brustad profile 

Railway stations on the Sørlandet Line
Railway stations in Hå
Railway stations opened in 1879
1879 establishments in Norway